Don Gummer (born December 12, 1946) is an American sculptor. His early work concentrated on table-top and wall-mounted sculpture. In the mid-1980s, he shifted his focus to large free-standing works, often in bronze. In the 1990s, he added a variety of other materials, such as stainless steel, aluminum and stained glass. His interest in large outdoor works also led him to an interest in public art. He is the husband of actress Meryl Streep.

Style
Critic Irving Sandler (writing in Art in America, January 2005) has noted that Gummer's work is recognizably rooted in constructivism, but also writes that "in extending and deflecting Constructivist art in a new direction, Gummer has rendered it peculiarly contemporary." Sandler also writes that Gummer's works "give postmodern life to classic principles of abstract composition."

Early life and education
Gummer was born in Louisville, Kentucky, on December 12, 1946, and grew up in Indiana. He is the son of Dorothy Ann (née Jacobson) and William Adolph Gummer, and has five brothers: William, Jack, Richard, Steven, and Mark.

He studied at Ben Davis High School, Indianapolis, and then at the Herron School of Art from 1964 to 1966. From 1966 to 1970, he studied at the School of the Museum of Fine Arts in Boston, Massachusetts, and then completed his studies at the Yale School of Art where he received his Bachelor of Fine Arts (BFA) and Master of Fine Arts (MFA), and studied with David von Schlegell.

Career 
Gummer's first solo show was in 1973. Since then, his works have been featured at two dozen solo shows at museums and galleries around the East Coast and Midwest. His work has also been exhibited in group shows.

Gummer's commissioned works have included Primary Compass (2000), a site-specific outdoor permanent sculpture at the Butler Institute of American Art, Youngstown, Ohio, and a sculpture/fountain in Historic New Harmony, New Harmony, Indiana. The Optimist” by Don Gummer was placed at the entrance of the Preston Arts Center, formerly the Henderson Fine Arts Center, on September 30, 2001, in Henderson, Kentucky. The sculpture made of cast stainless steel with a bronze base measures 7 ft. high, 4 ft. deep and 5 ft. in width and is mounted on a six-ton Indiana limestone base. “Fear and hate are no match for love and optimism” . . . Don Gummer . . . from speech at dedication and unveiling ceremony. "Primary Separation", a permanent installation at the Massachusetts Museum of Contemporary Art, was completed in 2006.

Personal life
Gummer married Peggy Jenel Lucas in the early seventies but divorced shortly after.

He married actress Meryl Streep on September 30, 1978. They have four children: musician Henry Wolfe, and actresses Mamie, Grace, and  Louisa.

Gummer and Streep are active philanthropists who donate to a range of arts organizations and educational institutions, including Vassar College, Opus School in Harlem, and the Silver Mountain Arts Foundation.

Public collections
 The Butler Institute of American Art, Youngstown, Ohio, US
 Chase Manhattan Bank, New York, US
 Chemical Bank, New York, US
 Evansville Museum of Arts, History and Science, Evansville, Indiana, US
 Preston Arts Center, Henderson, Kentucky, US
 The Equitable, New York, US
 Hiroshima Lying-in Hospital, Hiroshima, Japan
 International Creative Management, New York, US
 House of Music (1993) - Kitakyushu International Center, Kitakyushu, Japan
 Louisiana Museum, Humlebaek, Denmark
 McCrory Corporation, New York, US
 Joseph E. Seagram Company, New York, US
 Massachusetts Museum of Contemporary Art, US
 Cyberinfrastructure Building, Indiana University, Bloomington, Indiana, US
 Open Eyes and The South Tower, Indiana University-Purdue University Indianapolis, Indianapolis, Indiana, US

References

Citations

Books 
 Don Gummer; Peter Plagens; Evansville Museum of Arts, History and Science;  Butler Institute of American Art;  Indiana State Museum. The lyrical constructivist: Don Gummer sculpture (Chesterfield, Mass.: Chameleon Books; Evansville, Ind.: Evansville Museum of Arts, History & Science, 2001) ; ; 
 Douglas G Schultz; Albright-Knox Art Gallery. Eight sculptors: an exhibition (Buffalo : Albright-Knox Art Gallery, 1979) ; 
 Joseph Thompson; Massachusetts Museum of Contemporary Art. Don Gummer: primary separation (North Adams, Mass.: Massachusetts Museum of Contemporary Art, 2006) ;

External links

 
 Indianapolis' Newest Piece of Public Art, Herron School of Art eNews, Indiana University Purdue University Indianapolis.

1946 births
20th-century American sculptors
20th-century male artists
21st-century American sculptors
21st-century male artists
Artists from Indianapolis
Artists from Louisville, Kentucky
Herron School of Art and Design alumni
Living people
Meryl Streep
Sculptors from Indiana
Sculptors from Kentucky
Yale University alumni